P.O.L.O.V.I.R.U.S. was the second album by the Polish group Kury, released in 1998.

The album won a Fryderyk for Album of the Year - Alternative. "Jesienna deprecha" was nominated for song of the year. The band also got nominations for group of the year and video of the year.

Track listing
 "Śmierdzi mi z ust" (Tymański) – 3:11
 "Jesienna deprecha" (Tymański) – 3:40
 "Nie martw się, Janusz" (Tymański-Deriglasoff-Pawlak) – 5:35
 "Dlaczego" (Tymański-Deriglasoff-Pawlak) – 2:35
 "gadka I" – 0:25
 "Kibolski" (Tymański-Deriglasoff-Pawlak) – 4:24
 "gadka II" – 1:15
 "Sztany, glany" (Deriglasoff-mel.trad.) – 4:22
 "Ideały Sierpnia" (Tymański-Handschke) – 1:51
 "Trygław cz. I" (Tymański-Pawlak-Olter) – 0:19
 "Nie mam jaj" (Tymański) – 3:23
 "Trygław cz. II" (Tymański-Pawlak-Olter) – 1:27
 "Szatan" (Tymański) – 1:24
 "gadka III" – 2:28
 "Mój dżez" (Tymański) – 2:55
 "Adam ma dobry Humer" (Tymański-mel.trad.) – 1:25
 "O psie" (Tymański) – 2:08
 "Lemur/ noktowidzenije Kryszak-Roshiego" (Tymański-Gwinciński) – 7:07

Personnel
 Ryszard Tymon Tymański – voice, guitar, bass guitar
 Piotr Pawlak – guitar, voice
 Jacek Olter – drums
 Olaf Deriglasoff – samples, voice
 Leszek Możdżer – piano, keyboards, voice
 Jerzy Mazzoll – clarinet, voice
 Tomasz Gwinciński – guitar
 Jacek Siciarek – voice
 Radowan Jacuniak – voice
 Larry "Okey" Ugwu – voice
 Grzegorz Nawrocki – voice
 Mirosław Rymarz – voice
 Tofil – voice

References

External links
 KURY: "P.O.L.O.V.I.R.U.S" Biodro Records

1998 albums